Dennis Walter Piers (10 May 1929 – 9 September 2005) was a South African cricketer who played two first-class matches for Orange Free State during the 1947–48 season.

Piers was born in Leribe (or Hlotse), in what is now Lesotho (previously part of the British colony of Basutoland). He is one of only a handful of first-class cricketers to be born in that country. Both of Piers' matches for Orange Free State came in March 1948, towards the end of that season's Currie Cup. On debut against Western Province, he scored 24 and 6, while in the next match, against Eastern Province, he scored a duck in the first innings and 11 run in the second. In all four of his innings, he came in ninth in the batting order. Despite making his debut at the age of 17, Piers played no further matches for Orange Free State. He died in Randburg, a suburb of Johannesburg, in September 2005, aged 76.

Notes

References

1929 births
2005 deaths
Free State cricketers
Lesotho cricketers
South African cricketers
People from Leribe District